Woyzeck is an unfinished play written by Georg Büchner, first performed in 1913.

Woyzeck may also refer to:

 Woyzeck, a 1966 German TV film adaptation directed by Rudolf Noelte
 Woyzeck (1979 film), an adaptation of the play written and directed by Werner Herzog
 Woyzeck (1994 film), a Hungarian adaptation of the play
 Woyzeck (musical), a 2000 stage musical adaptation of the play
 Woyzeck, a 2013 German TV film adaptation starring Tom Schilling

See also
 Wozzeck (disambiguation)